is a former Japanese football player.

Playing career
Taniike was born in Minamiawaji on April 5, 1977. After graduating from University of Tsukuba, he joined J1 League club Vissel Kobe based in his local in 2000. However he could not play at all in the match in 2000. In 2001, he moved to Japan Football League (JFL) club Otsuka Pharmaceutical (later Tokushima Vortis). He became a regular player as center back. The club also won the champions in 2003 and 2004 and was promoted to J2 League from 2005. Although he played many matches as right back of three backs defense in 2005, he could hardly play in the match in 2006. In 2007, he moved to JFL club Tochigi SC and played many matches. In 2008, he moved to JFL club Sony Sendai. He played many matches as regular player for a long time and retired end of 2013 season.

Club statistics

References

External links

1977 births
Living people
University of Tsukuba alumni
Association football people from Hyōgo Prefecture
Japanese footballers
J1 League players
J2 League players
Japan Football League players
Vissel Kobe players
Tokushima Vortis players
Tochigi SC players
Sony Sendai FC players
Association football defenders